After the Verdict is a six-part Australian drama television series which premiered on Nine Network on 10 August 2022.

Premise
Four people finish jury duty on a high profile murder case, however, once back in their regular day-to-day lives, they start to question their verdict and begin their own investigations. That obsession with the case begins to impact their personal lives.

Production
The series was first announced at Nine’s 2022 upfronts in September 2021, Lincoln Younes, Sullivan Stapleton, Michelle Davidson and Magda Szubanski were confirmed to star in the series.

Cast
 Lincoln Younes as Ollie
 Sullivan Stapleton as Daniel
 Magda Szubanski as Margie
 Michelle Lim Davidson as Clara
 Tess Haubrich as Heidi Lang
 Nicholas Brown as Paul
 Coco Jack Gillies as Zoe
 Richard Brancatisano as Dom
 Vivienne Awosaga as Tamara
 Emma Diaz as Eliza
 Jim Punnett as Tipstaff
 Virginia Gay as Trish
 Bernard Curry
 Libby Tanner
 Hazem Shammas as Detective Sarti
 Brielle Flynn as Detective Mills
 Holly Leonard as Mia

Episodes

See also
The Twelve
De Twaalf
The Jury
House Husbands

References

External links

After the Verdict on 9Now

Nine Network original programming
Australian television series
2020s Australian drama television series
2020s crime drama television series
Thriller television series
Crime thriller television series
2022 Australian television series debuts
English-language television shows
Television shows set in Sydney